The medial talocalcaneal ligament (internal calcaneo-astragaloid ligament) connects the medial tubercle of the back of the talus with the back of the sustentaculum tali.

Its fibers blend with those of the plantar calcaneonavicular ligament.

References 

Ligaments of the lower limb